Nightbreed of Macabria is the sixth studio album by the band Theatres des Vampires. This album is their first to not contain any black metal influence and is credited as a pure goth metal release. This was also frontman Lord Vampyr's last album with Theatres des Vampires.

It is a concept album dealing with the fictional world of Macabria. The album was highly influenced by the works of American film producer Tim Burton.

Track listing

Line-up 
Alexander − vocals, acoustic guitar, backing vocals
Scarlet − vocals
Fabian − keyboards, samples, backing vocals
Robert − guitars, acoustic guitar
Zimon − bass
Gabriel − drums, backing vocals

Guest members 
Claudia Cucinelli − choir
Francesco Grasso − choir
Stefano Dimitri − violins
Angela Moranti − viola
Marta Di Russo − cello
Erick Frontier − horns
Mauro Denti − wind instruments
R. Sciamanna − lyrics

References

Theatres des Vampires albums
2004 albums
Concept albums